Aghasur (also Romanized as Āghāsūr; also known as Āqā Sūr) is a village in Mangur-e Sharqi Rural District, Khalifan District, Mahabad County, West Azerbaijan Province, Iran. At the 2006 census, its population was 179, in 20 families.

References 

Tageo

Populated places in Mahabad County